The 1936–37 Bradford City A.F.C. season was the 30th in the club's history.

The club finished 21st in Division Two, and reached the 3rd round of the FA Cup. The club was relegated to Division Three North.

Sources

References

Bradford City A.F.C. seasons
Bradford City